Scottsville is an unincorporated community in Lafayette Township, Floyd County, Indiana.

History
Scottsville was laid out in 1853 on land settled by the Scott brothers in 1812. A post office was established at Scottsville in 1856, and remained in operation until it was discontinued in 1904.

Geography

References

Unincorporated communities in Floyd County, Indiana
Unincorporated communities in Indiana
Louisville metropolitan area
Populated places established in 1853
1853 establishments in Indiana